Antonio La Forgia (24 December 1944 – 10 June 2022) was an Italian politician. From 1996 to 1999, he was president of Emilia-Romagna and of the Emilia-Romagna Legislative Assembly from 2000 to 2005. From 2006 to 2013, he served as deputy, representing the Democratic Party. 

La Forgia died in Bologna on 10 June 2022, at the age of 77.

References

1944 births
2022 deaths
Deputies of Legislature XV of Italy
Deputies of Legislature XVI of Italy
Presidents of Emilia-Romagna
Members of the Legislative Assembly of Emilia-Romagna
Italian Communist Party politicians
Democratic Party of the Left politicians
The Democrats (Italy) politicians
Democracy is Freedom – The Daisy politicians
Democratic Party (Italy) politicians
20th-century Italian politicians
21st-century Italian politicians
People from Forlì